West Coast Council is a local government body in Tasmania, covering much of the western region of the state. West Coast is classified as a rural local government area and has a population of 4,167. The major towns and localities of the region include Strahan, Rosebery, Zeehan and the principal town of Queenstown.

History and attributes

The West Coast has a rich mining and railway heritage as well as a historic convict settlement. It is the largest of the 29 Tasmanian councils by area, and the second least densely populated, after the Central Highlands. It takes in the West Coast Range as well as portions of the World Heritage areas.

The region experiences relatively extreme weather conditions, notably high yearly rainfall totals due to frontal systems, especially at Lake Margaret and Mount Read.

West Coast is classified as rural, agricultural and medium (RAM) under the Australian Classification of Local Governments.

History
Local government in Western Tasmania evolved from locality based councils created in the late nineteenth and twentieth centuries:

 Gormanston Municipal Council (1907-1986) - became part of the Lyell Council
 Lyell Municipal Council (1986-1993)
 Queenstown Municipal Council (1907-1986) - became part of the Lyell Council
 Strahan Municipal Council (1907-1993)
 Zeehan Municipal Council (1907-1993)

On 2 April 1993, the municipalities of Lyell, Strahan and Zeehan were amalgamated to form the West Coast Council.

Historically the region was more oriented towards the North - due to the main transport being by either rail to Burnie up until the 1950s and 1960s, or by ship out of Strahan until the mid twentieth century. There were no land based transport routes to the south. Consequently, many residents who could afford shopping trips would go to Melbourne in Victoria, rather than Hobart in Tasmania.

Some of the small population is located in the small cluster of towns near Macquarie Harbour - Strahan and Queenstown, these were linked in their connection with the Mount Lyell Mining and Railway Company

While further north Zeehan and Rosebery are settlements that developed from early quite separate mining operations, but were linked by their reliance upon the Emu Bay Railway
There a number of ghost towns or abandoned mining communities in the West Coast, with some such as Crotty actually submerged under hydro-electric scheme dams.

Councillors
As of the 2022 Tasmanian Local Government elections, the council consists of the following members:

Localities

Not in above list
 Corinna
 Cradle Mountain
 Granville Harbour
 Lake St Clair
 Macquarie Heads
 Southwest
 West Coast

See also
List of local government areas of Tasmania

References

External links
West Coast Council official website
Local Government Association Tasmania
Tasmanian Electoral Commission - local government

 
Local government areas of Tasmania
Western Tasmania
South West Tasmania